The 1915–16 Penn State Nittany Lions basketball team represented Penn State University during the 1915–16 college men's basketball season. The head coach was Burke Hermann, in his first season coaching the Nittany Lions. The team finished with a final record of 8–3.

Schedule

|-

References

Penn State Nittany Lions basketball seasons
Penn State
Penn State Nittany Lions Basketball Team
Penn State Nit